Brand New is the sixth studio album by Ben Rector. It was released on August 28, 2015. It is the second album he has released under his own record label, Aptly Named Recordings. The first single "Brand New" which was produced by Ed Cash & David Hodges, debuted  at number 94 on the Billboard Hot 100 and then peaked at number 9.

Track listing

Personnel

 Ben Rector – clappers, acoustic guitar, electric guitar, classical guitar, Hammond B-3 organ, keyboards, mandolin, piano, programming, string arrangements, synthesizer bass, lead vocals, background vocals
 Hank Bentley – electric guitar
 Avery Bright – violin
 Zach Casebolt – violin
 Ed Cash – acoustic guitar, keyboards, programming, background vocals
 Cason Cooley – keyboards, programming
 Chad Copelin – bass guitar, Hammond B-3 organ, programming
 Nathan Dugger – 12-string electric guitar, electric guitar
 Cara Fox – cello
 Cody Fry – string arrangements, conductor
 David Hodges – bass guitar, programming
 Jeremy Lutito – drums, programming
 Melodie Morris – cello
 Michael O'Gieblyn – violin
 Matt Pierson – bass guitar
 Kyle Pudenz – violin
 Rose Rodgers – viola
 Will Sayles – drums
 Jacob Schrodt – drums
 Marc Scibilia – synthesizer bass
 Ben Shive – keyboards, programming, pump organ, synthesizer bass
 Matt Stanfield – keyboards, piano, programming
 Aaron Sterling – drums, programming
 Kevin Sweers – cello

Charts

References

2015 albums
Ben Rector albums
Self-released albums
Albums produced by Ed Cash
Albums produced by Cason Cooley
Albums produced by David Hodges